Qerekhlu (also Romanized as Qerkhlu , Gherkhloo, Gherekhloo) is a village in Nazluy-ye Jonubi Rural District, in the Central District of Urmia County, West Azerbaijan Province, Iran. At the 2006 census, its population was 93, in 30 families.

References 

Populated places in Urmia County